The 25th Air Cavalry Brigade is an air assault brigade in the Polish Land Forces, formed in 1999. The unit is based in Tomaszów Mazowiecki. It's patron is Józef Poniatowski.

Gallery

References 

Army brigades of Poland
Military units and formations established in 1999
1999 establishments in Poland